An Event is a 1969 Yugoslav feature film directed by Vatroslav Mimica, based on a short story by Anton Chekhov.

The adapted story was translated into English as "An Adventure (A Driver's Story)".

References

External links

An Event at hrfilm.hr 

1969 films
Croatian drama films
Yugoslav drama films
Serbo-Croatian-language films
Films directed by Vatroslav Mimica
Jadran Film films
Films based on short fiction
Films based on works by Anton Chekhov